Kathleen Honora Greatorex (1851–1942)  American painter and illustrator born in Hoboken, New Jersey, known for her still life and flower paintings.

Her mother, Eliza Pratt Greatorex was a well known painter and printmaker associated with the Hudson River School while her father, Henry Wellington Greatorex, was a respected musician. Throughout her career she worked closely with her mother and sister. Following the untimely murder of her brother Thomas Anthony Greatorex in Colorado in 1881, the Greatorex women left New York City and moved to Moret-sur-Loing, in the Ile de France. During the final years of his life, noted Impressionist painter Alfred Sisley, resident of Moret, developed a close friendship with Kathleen Greatorex. Following the death of her sister Eleanor Elizabeth Greatorex (1854-1908) Kathleen sold a portion of her property to American art-dealer and critic Sarah Tyson Hallowell, whose niece Harriett Hallowell was named as Kathleen's sole heir when Greatorex died of old age (91) on May 6, 1942 at 3 Place de Samois in Moret-sur-Loing.

Early years
Greatorex began her art studies with her mother before moving to Paris where she studies with Jean-Jacques Henner and then to Germany to study at the Munich Pinakothek. She continued her studies in Rome.

Career
Greatorex showed at least three pieces at the 1893 World's Columbian Exposition  in Chicago.
Greatorex’s works can be found in:
 Raydon Gallery, New York, New York
 Sotheby Parke Bernet, New York,
 Marbella Gallery New York
as well as in many private collections.

The life and work of Kathleen Honora Greatorex is discussed by Dr. Katherine Manthorne in Restless Enterprise: The Life and Art of Eliza Pratt Greatorex. University of California Press. 2020

Greatorex’s work as a still life painter is discussed by art historians Gerdts and Burke in their book American Still Life Painting (1971)

Her sister, Eleanor Elizabeth Greatorex (1854-1908) was also a well known painter.

Gallery

References

1851 births
1942 deaths
19th-century American painters
American women painters
19th-century American women artists